The 1966 San Francisco 49ers season was the franchise's 17th season in the National Football League and their 21st overall.

Offseason

NFL Draft

Roster

Regular season

Schedule

Game summaries

Week 1

Standings

Awards, records, and honors

References

External links 
 1966 49ers on Pro Football Reference
 49ers Schedule on jt-sw.com

San Francisco 49ers seasons
San Francisco 49ers
San Fran
1966 in San Francisco